The little ringed plover (Charadrius dubius) is a small plover. The genus name Charadrius is a Late Latin word for a yellowish bird mentioned in the fourth-century Vulgate. It derives from Ancient Greek kharadrios a bird found in river valleys (kharadra, "ravine"). The specific dubius is Latin for doubtful, since Sonnerat, writing in 1776, thought this bird might be just a variant of common ringed plover.

Description 

Adult little ringed plovers have a grey-brown back and wings, a white belly and a white breast with one black neckband. They have a brown cap, a white forehead, a black mask around the eyes with white above and a short dark bill. The legs are flesh-coloured and the toes are all webbed.

This species differs from the larger ringed plover in leg colour, the head pattern, and the presence of a clear yellow eye-ring.

Gallery

Habitats and range 
Their breeding habitat is open gravel areas near freshwater, including gravel pits, islands and river edges across the Palearctic including northwestern Africa. They nest on the ground on stones with little or no plant growth. Both males and females take turns incubating the eggs.

They are migratory and winter in Africa. These birds forage for food on muddy areas, usually by sight. They eat insects and worms.

Subspecies
Three subspecies recognized.
C. d. curonicus J. F. Gmelin, 1789 - from Eurasia, Russian Fareast, Japan, Korea, China to North Africa. Winter spends in Sahara, Sri Lanka, to Indonesia and China.
C. d. jerdoni (Legge, 1880) - from India, Sri Lanka, Pakistan to South East Asia.
C. d. dubius Scopoli, 1786 - from the Philippines, New Guinea to Bismarck Archipelago.

Conservation 
The little ringed plover is one of the species to which the Agreement on the Conservation of African-Eurasian Migratory Waterbirds (AEWA) applies.

References

External links 

 Little ringed plover Images and documentation 
 Sexing and ageing (PDF; 5.4 MB) by Javier Blasco-Zumeta & Gerd-Michael Heinze
 
 
 
 
 
 
 
 

little ringed plover
Birds of Eurasia
Birds of Africa
little ringed plover
Taxa named by Giovanni Antonio Scopoli